The Lindens, also known as the King Hooper House, is an historic three-story house located in the Kalorama Heights neighborhood of Washington, D.C. It is the oldest house in Washington (although it was not originally built there) and has been listed on the National Register of Historic Places since 1969.

The house was built in Danvers, Massachusetts, in 1754 as a grand summer home for Robert "King" Hooper, a leading shipowner and merchant in Marblehead, Massachusetts, who sided with the Tories before the Revolutionary War and lent the house for four months to Thomas Gage, the reviled British governor. Hooper lost the house to creditors. After passing through several other owners, including one who used it as a boardinghouse, the house was purchased in 1860 by Francis Peabody Jr., who restored and added to it.

It was again sold in 1933 to antiques dealers Israel Sack and Leon David, who sold the paneled drawing room to a Kansas City museum.

The Morrises had the house  dismantled and shipped to Washington, with the pieces numbered, in six railroad boxcars. Under the direction of the key architect at Colonial Williamsburg, it was slowly reassembled from 1935 to 1938 on a concrete foundation, supported by steel beams. Over the next 45 years, some 50,000 visitors passed through the house, greeted by the owners in period costume. In 1983 it was sold to Norman and Diane Bernstein, who modernized and updated the kitchen and plumbing. At that time, some of the furnishings were auctioned for $2.3 million at Christie's. In 2007 it was resold for $7.2 million, and in 2016 the house was listed for sale again.

The house measures , with 11 fireplaces, and has nearly  ceilings, interior columns, stenciled floors, and wallpaper designed in Paris in the early 1800s.

See also
Robert "King" Hooper Mansion (Marblehead, Massachusetts)

References

 
 
 
 15 Things You Must Know About Washington’s Oldest Mansion
 Washington, D.C.'s Oldest House is On the Market for $10.5M
 15 Things You Must Know About Washington's Oldest Mansion
 The House History Man: The Oldest House in Washington, DC

Houses completed in 1754
Houses on the National Register of Historic Places in Washington, D.C.
1754 establishments in Massachusetts
Relocated buildings and structures in Washington, D.C.